Abilene Christian University Press, also known as ACU Press, is an Abilene, Texas-based university press that is connected with Abilene Christian University. Since being formed it has released or acquired 456 titles and  the press releases, on average, thirty-six titles per year. The press is a member of the Association of University Presses. The press publishes works in the areas of "Christianity and Literature; Faith-Based Higher Education; History and Theology of the Stone-Campbell Movement; Texas History and Culture." Leafwood Publishers is an imprint of ACU Press.

Notable authors
C. Leonard Allen
James Burton Coffman
Everett Ferguson
Douglas A. Foster
Gary Holloway
Larry M. James
Walt McDonald
Michael A. O'Donnell
Rick Ostrander
Jerry Pattengale
Rubel Shelly
Darryl Tippens
Jeanne Murray Walker

See also

 List of English-language book publishing companies
 List of university presses
 Academic publishing

References

External links
Abilene Christian University Press

Book publishing companies based in Texas
Press
Abilene Christian University
Christian publishing companies
Publishing companies established in 1984
1984 establishments in Texas